Madurai district is one of the 38 districts of the state of Tamil Nadu in southeastern India. The city of Madurai serves as the district headquarters. It houses the famous Sri Meenakshi Sundareshwarar temple and is situated on the banks of the river Vaigai. Thiruparankundram is one of the major tourist place in the district. As of 2011, the district had a population of 3,038,252 with a sex-ratio of 990 females for every 1,000 males. Aside from the city of Madurai, the larger towns are Melur, Vadipatti, Thirumangalam, Thirupparankundram, Peraiyur, and Usilampatti. It is an important hub for various film shootings. Alanganallur is a popular spot in the district for Jallikattu, as are Palamedu and Avaniyapuram.

History
Madurai is called by various nicknames like Athens of the East, Thoonga Nagaram (City that never Sleeps), Naan maada koodal (City of Four junctions), Malligai Managar (City of Jasmine), Koodal Managar (City of Junction) Koil Nagar (Temple city), etc.  The main kingdoms which ruled Madurai during various times are the Pandyas and the Nayaks.

Geography 
The district is bounded by Theni in the west, Sivaganga in the east, Dindigul in the north, Virudhunagar in the south and small parts of Tiruchirappalli in the northeast. Madurai district witnessing hot and humid weather throughout the year and considered as hottest district of Tamil Nadu as well hottest city.

Climate

The climate has extremes. There are three distinct periods of rainfall:
 advancing monsoon period and south west monsoon from June to September, with strong southwest winds;
 north east monsoon from October to December, with dominant north east winds;
 dry season from January to May.
 Madurai District is the hottest district of Tamil Nadu throughout the year. district receives average rainfall and heavy heat which is prevails from March to September. madurai recorded 42℃ at the time of September month.

Demographics

According to 2011 census, Madurai district had a population of 3,038,252 up from 2,578,201 in the 2001 census, for a growth rate of 17.95%. It had a sex-ratio of 990 females for every 1,000 males, up from 978 in 2001, and much above the national average of 929. A total of 313,978 were under the age of six, constituting 162,517 males and 151,461 females. Scheduled Castes and Scheduled Tribes accounted for 13.46% and 0.37% of the population, respectively. The average literacy of the district was 74.83%, compared to the national average of 72.99%. 60.78% of the population lives in urban areas.

The district had a total of 794,887 households. There were a total of 1,354,632 workers, comprising 81,352 cultivators, 287,731 main agricultural labourers, 39,753 in house hold industries, 765,066 other workers, 180,730 marginal workers, 11,367 marginal cultivators, 85,097 marginal agricultural labourers, 7,540 marginal workers in household industries and 76,726 other marginal workers.

At the time of the 2011 census, 92.56% of the population spoke Tamil, 3.20% Saurashtra and 2.58% Telugu as their first language.

Politics 

|}
Madurai district contains the entirety of Madurai Lok Sabha constituency, and parts of Theni and Virudhunagar Lok Sabha constituencies.

Divisions
Madurai district comprises 13 talukas and revenue blocks, same names same boundaries. Under the gram panchayat system rural administration or the district is done by panchayat villages and the taluka headquarters. The revenue blocks are further sub-divided by firkas. The three taluks, Tiruparankundram, Madurai West and Madurai East, were created in February 2014.
The thirteen talukas/blocks are:

2001 census

In the 2001 census, Madurai district had only seven talukas: Madurai North, Madurai South, Melur, Peraiyur, Thirumangalam, Vadipatti, and Usilampatti.

Tourist attractions
 Madurai Meenakshiamman temple
 Alagar temple
 Pazhamuthircholai (one of Abodes of Lord Murga)
 Gandhi Memorial Museum, Madurai (Erst while Rani Mangammal Palace)
 Thirumalai Nayakar Mahal
 Theppakulam, Vandiyur
 Madurai Maqbara
 Alanganallur jallikattu Madurai
 Thiruvathavur Thirumarainathar Temple and Birthplace of Manicka Vasakar
 Thirumohoor Kalamegaperumal Temple
 Thirupparamkunram Murugan temple
 1000 Thoon Mandapam (1000 pillar hall)
 Eco park
 Kuruvithurai Vallaba Perumal Temple
 Vaigai Dam (nearby)
 Anaipatti Anjaneyar Temple
 Kodaikanal (nearby)
 Suruli falls (nearby)
 Kutladampatti falls
 Kazimar Big Mosque, situated on the banks of Kiruthumal river (the oldest mosque in Madurai)

See also
List of districts of Tamil Nadu

References

External links

Madurai District

 
Districts of Tamil Nadu